N. Gail Lawrence (also known as Gail Lawrence) is an American television soap opera writer.

Positions held
All My Children (hired by Megan McTavish)
 Associate Head Writer: 1994 - 1996, 1998–2001, 2013

Days of Our Lives
 Writer: 1993

Guiding Light
 Associate Head Writer: 1996 - 1998
 Script Writer: 1984 - 1993

Passions (hired by James E. Reilly)
 Associate Head Writer: 2001 - 2007

Santa Barbara
 Script Writer: 1993

Awards and nominations
Daytime Emmy Awards

WINS
(1986, 1990 & 1993; Best Writing; Guiding Light)
(1996; Best Writing; All My Children)

NOMINATIONS 
(1985, 1989, 1992 & 1999; Best Writing; Guiding Light)
(1995, 1999, 2001 & 2002; Best Writing; All My Children) 
(2003; Best Writing; Passions)

Writers Guild of America Award

WINS
(1992 season; Guiding Light)
(1999, 2001 & 2002 seasons; All My Children)

NOMINATIONS 
(1985, 1986, 1989, 1998 & 1999 seasons; Guiding Light) 
(1994 season; Days of Our Lives)
(1996 & 2000 seasons; All My Children)

External links

American women television writers
Year of birth missing (living people)
American soap opera writers
Daytime Emmy Award winners
Writers Guild of America Award winners
Living people
Women soap opera writers
21st-century American women